Prevention of Money Laundering Act, 2002 is an Act of the Parliament of India enacted by the NDA government to prevent money-laundering and to provide for confiscation of property derived from money-laundering. PMLA and the Rules notified there under came into force with effect from July 1, 2005. The Act and Rules notified there under impose obligation on banking companies, financial institutions and intermediaries to verify identity of clients, maintain records and furnish information in prescribed form to Financial Intelligence Unit - India (FIU-IND).

The act was amended in the year 2005, 2009 and 2012.

On 24 Nov 2017, in a ruling in favour of citizens' liberty, the Supreme Court has set aside a clause in the Prevention of Money Laundering Act, which made it virtually impossible for a person convicted to more than three years in jail to get bail if the public prosecutor opposed it. (Section 45 of the PMLA Act, 2002, provides that no person can be granted bail for any offence under the Act unless the public prosecutor, appointed by the government, gets a chance to oppose his bail. And should the public prosecutor choose to oppose bail, the court has to be convinced that the accused was not guilty of the crime and additionally that he/she was not likely to commit any offence while out on bail- a tall order by any count.) (It observed that the provision violates Articles 14 and 21 of the Indian Constitution)

Objectives 
The PMLA seeks to combat money laundering in India and has three main objectives:
 To prevent and control money laundering.
 To confiscate and seize the property obtained from the laundered money; and
 To deal with any other issue connected with money laundering in India.

Key definitions 
 Attachment: Prohibition of transfer, conversion, disposition or movement of property by an appropriate legal order.
 Proceeds of crime: Any property derived or obtained, directly or indirectly, by any person as a result of criminal activity relating to a scheduled offence.
 Money-laundering: Whosoever directly or indirectly attempts to indulge or assist other person or actually involved in any activity connected with the proceeds of crime and projecting it as untainted property.
 Payment System: A system that enables payment to be effected between a payer and a beneficiary, involving clearing, payment or settlement service or all of them. It includes the systems enabling credit card, debit card, smart card, money transfer or similar operations.

Salient features

Punishment for money-laundering 
The Act prescribes that any person found guilty of money-laundering shall be punishable with rigorous imprisonment from three years to seven years and where the proceeds of crime involved relate to any offence under paragraph 2 of Part A of the Schedule (Offences under the Narcotic Drugs and Psychotropic Substance Act, 1985), the maximum punishment may extend to 10 years instead of 7 years.

Powers of attachment of tainted property 
The Director or officer above the rank of Deputy Director with the authority of the Director, can provisionally attach property believed to be "proceeds of crime" for 180 days. Such an order is required to be confirmed by an independent Adjudicating Authority.

Adjudicating Authority 
The Adjudicating Authority is the authority appointed by the central government through notification to exercise jurisdiction, powers and authority conferred under PMLA. It decides whether any of the property attached or seized is involved in money laundering.

The Adjudicating Authority shall not be bound by the procedure laid down by the Code of Civil Procedure,1908, but shall be guided by the principles of natural justice and subject to the other provisions of PMLA. The Adjudicating Authority shall have powers to regulate its own procedure.

Presumption in inter-connected transactions 
Where money laundering involves two or more inter-connected transactions and one or more such transactions is or are proved to be involved in money laundering, then for the purposes of adjudication or confiscation, it shall be presumed that the remaining transactions form part of such inter-connected transactions.

Burden of proof 
A person, who is accused of having committed the offence of money laundering, has to prove that alleged proceeds of crime are in fact lawful property.

Appellate Tribunal 
An Appellate Tribunal is the body appointed by Govt of India. It is given the power to hear appeals against the orders of the Adjudicating Authority and any other authority under the Act. Orders of the tribunal can be appealed in appropriate High Court (for that jurisdiction) and finally to the Supreme Court

Special Court 
Section 43 of Prevention of Money Laundering Act, 2002 (PMLA) says that the Central Government, in consultation with the Chief Justice of the High Court, shall, for trial of offence punishable under Section 4, by notification, designate one or more Courts of Session as Special Court or Special Courts for such area or areas or for such case or class or group of cases as may be specified in the notification.

FIU-IND 
Financial Intelligence Unit – India (FIU-IND) was set by the Government of India on 18 November 2004 as the central national agency responsible for receiving, processing, analyzing and disseminating information relating to suspect financial transactions. FIU-IND is also responsible for coordinating and strengthening efforts of national and international intelligence, investigation and enforcement agencies in pursuing the global efforts against money laundering and related crimes. FIU-IND is an independent body reporting directly to the Economic Intelligence Council (EIC) headed by the Finance Minister.

Criticism

In July 2022, according to data shared by the Union government in Parliament, only 23 people have been convicted in 5,422 cases registered under the Prevention of Money Laundering Act (PMLA) in the 17 years after the law was passed—a conviction rate of less than 0.5%. Due to low conviction rate and the people against which the PMLA has been applied in last few years, lawyers argue that the PMLA is invoked against a political rival or a dissenter, because the “process is itself the punishment”. The accused does not even know what allegations are put against them.

2022 Supreme Court Judgement

On 27 July 2022, The Supreme Court of India upheld the provisions of the act and retained the powers of the Enforcement Directorate under the PMLA, which was criticized for putting the personal liberty of citizens at risk by the undue process allowed by the provisions of PMLA.

On 22 August 2022, Supreme Court accepted a petition to review its 27 July 2022 judgement which upheld core amendments made to the Prevention of Money Laundering Act (PMLA). On 25 August 2022, Supreme Court said that two provisions, not providing a copy of the Enforcement Case Information Report to the accused, and reversal of the presumption of innocence, need reconsideration.

Similar laws in other countries

Money Laundering Control Act of 1986 

This is an Act of the United States Congress that made money laundering a Federal crime. It criminalized money laundering for the first time in the United States.
 Established money laundering as a federal crime
 Prohibited structuring transactions to evade CTR filings
 Introduced civil and criminal forfeiture for BSA violations and other violations. 
 Directed banks to establish and maintain procedures to ensure and monitor compliance with the reporting and record keeping requirements of the BSA

See also
 List of Acts of the Parliament of India

References

Acts of the Parliament of India 2002
Vajpayee administration initiatives
Anti-money laundering measures
Economic history of India (1947–present)
Anti-corruption measures in India
Asset forfeiture
2002 in Indian economy